The Huaylas Province is one of 20 provinces of the Ancash Region in Peru.

Geography 
The Cordillera Blanca and the Cordillera Negra traverse the province. Some of the highest peaks of the province are Artesonraju, Chacraraju, Quitaraju, Pucajirca, Pucaraju and Huandoy. Other mountains are listed below:

Some of the largest lakes of the province are Arwayqucha, Hatunqucha, Ichikqucha, Pukaqucha, Quyllurqucha, Tawlliqucha and Wiqruqucha.

Political division

Huaylas is divided into ten districts, which are:

Ethnic groups 
The people in the province are mainly indigenous citizens of Quechua descent. Quechua is the language which the majority of the population (57.20%) learnt to speak in childhood, 42.59% of the residents started speaking using the Spanish language (2007 Peru Census).

See also 
 Allpamayu (river)
 Santa River
 Yuraqmayu
 Yuraqqucha

References

External links
  Official web site of the Huaylas province

Huaylas Province